The Bush Brotherhood was a group of Anglican religious orders providing itinerant priests to minister to sparsely-settled rural districts in Australia. They were described as a "band of men" who could "preach like Apostles" and "ride like cowboys".

History
The St Andrew's Bush Brotherhood was established in 1897 in Longreach, Queensland, by the Bishop of Stepney, Canon Body and the Bishop of Rockhampton, Nathaniel Dawes. The first group of brothers was led by the Reverend George Halford.

The Brotherhood of the Good Shepherd was established about 1903 in Dubbo, New South Wales. The Brotherhood of the Good Shepherd published The Bush Brother magazine from 1904 to 1980.

The Bush Brotherhood of St Boniface operated in the Diocese of Bunbury in Western Australia from July 1911 to 1929.

In 1922, Bryan Robin published a book "The Sundowner" about his experiences in the Bush Brotherhood of St Barnabas in North Queensland from 1914 to 1921. This book attracted other priests to join the brotherhood.

The Brotherhood of St John the Baptist was established in Murray Bridge, South Australia.

The Bush Brotherhood of St Paul operated in Charleville and Cunnamulla in Queensland.

Operation of the orders
There were a number of different orders of Bush Brothers, but all operated on a similar basis of an almost monastic life, committed to:
 temporary vows of poverty, chastity and obedience
 periodic returns from the bush to a community house for spiritual replenishment
 obedience to a warden or principal (often a bishop)
Their duties included:
 giving religious instruction in schools
 holding services
 administering sacraments
The Bush Brothers were either single (or left their wives behind during their period of service). Many were recruited from England where life in the Outback had a romantic appeal. Australian brothers were less frequently recruited.

Although the Bush Brothers originally rode horses, they drove vehicles in later years.

Notable members 
 William Barrett, Dean of Brisbane
 Wilfrid Belcher, Bishop of North Queensland
 Stephen Davies, Bishop of Carpentaria
 William Elsey, Bishop of Kalgoorlie
 John Feetham, Bishop of North Queensland
 Godfrey Fryar, Bishop of Rockhampton
 George Halford, Bishop of Rockhampton
 Frederick Hulton-Sams, known as the "fighting parson" for his boxing skills, he died in 1915 in World War I. His friends wrote a book about his experiences as a bush brother.
 John Hazlewood, Bishop of Ballarat
 Barry Hunter, Bishop of Riverina
 Hamish Jamieson, Bishop of Carpentaria and Bunbury
 Lionel Renfrey, Dean of Adelaide
 Bryan Robin, Bishop of Adelaide
 Guy Roxby, died from typhoid in 1913, the first Brother to die in service 
 Richard Thomas, Bishop of Willochra
 Graham Howard Walden, Bishop of The Murray
 Arnold Wylde, Bishop of Bathurst

In popular culture
The narrator of Nevil Shute's novel In the Wet is a member of the Bush Brotherhood and provides a (fictional) account of the life of one of these itinerant priests.

See also
 The Bush Brother

References

Further reading
 
 
  — available online

Anglican Church of Australia
Anglican orders and communities